Putlibai Karamchand Gandhi (1844 — 12 June 1891) was the mother of Indian independence leader Mahatma Gandhi and the youngest wife of the former Rajkot Dewan Karamchand Gandhi. She was a devout practitioner of Hinduism by whom Mahatma Gandhi was schooled about his religion. She came from a village called Dantrana of the then-Junagadh State. She was twenty-two years younger than Karamchand who she had married after his first two wives had died early and the third was rendered childless. Mohandas was her youngest son, who she affectionately called Monia. Mahatma Gandhi wrote extensively about his mother and her conditions for him leaving India for England to pursue his education to become a barrister in his autobiography The Story of My Experiments with Truth.

References 

Putlibai
19th-century Indian women
1839 births
1891 deaths
Indian women